Oberea myops is a species of beetle in the family Cerambycidae. It was described by Haldeman in 1847. It is known from Canada.

References

myops
Beetles described in 1847